A list of the most films produced in the Cinema of Mexico ordered by year of release in the 1990s. For an alphabetical list of articles on Mexican films see :Category:Mexican films.

1990s

External links
 Mexican film at the Internet Movie Database

1980s
Mexican
Films